Archibus is an Integrated Workplace Management System (IWMS) platform developed by Archibus, Inc. The platform is integrated bi-directionally with building information modeling and CAD design software. Archibus software is reportedly used to manage around 15 million properties around the world. Archibus software is easily integrated with Mobile, GIS, and ERP systems such as Oracle, SAP, Sage and others.

Products
Archibus is a platform that includes a range of infrastructure and facilities management solutions, and is available in both Web-based and Microsoft Windowsbased platforms. The software can also be delivered in the cloud (SaaS).

Platforms:

Archibus Web Central
Archibus Smart Client
Archibus Mobile Framework

Delivery Models:
Archibus On-Premises  software installed within the building premises.
Archibus Hosted Services  software installed and used from a remote location.
Archibus SaaS  a software as a service model
Archibus Cloud  a software as a service model

Modules:

Real Property
Capital Projects
Space
Assets
Sustainability & Risk
Maintenance
Workplace Services
Technology Extensions
Professional Services

History
Founded in Boston, in 1983, Archibus software is the originator of IWMS software.

On December 5, 2018, JMI Equity, a growth equity firm focused on investing in leading software companies, made a strategic growth investment in both Archibus and Serraview.

References

See also
Autodesk Revit
ArchiCAD

Building information modeling